Herron School of Art and Design, officially IU Herron School of Art and Design, is a public art school at Indiana University–Purdue University Indianapolis (IUPUI) in Indianapolis, Indiana. It is a professional art school and has been accredited by the National Association of Schools of Art and Design since 1952.

The art school was founded in 1902 as the John Herron Art Institute, operating as an independent institution until its acquisition by Indiana University in 1967. In 2005, Herron relocated to Eskenazi Hall on the IUPUI campus after more than 100 years in the Herron–Morton Place neighborhood of Indianapolis.

Herron includes five galleries that exhibit contemporary works of art by national and international contemporary artists and designers, as well as the work of Herron faculty, alumni, and students; and the Basile Center for Art, Design, and Public Life, which enriches educational and interdisciplinary activities through civic engagement and community partnerships.  and was ranked 73rd overall by U.S. News & World Report among graduate schools of fine arts in 2022.

History
1800s
The Art Association of Indianapolis, formerly the Indiana School of Art, was established in 1883. In 1895, John Herron bequeathed most of his fortune (almost $250,000) to the Association, which was headed by suffragette May Wright Sewall. Herron stipulated that the money be used to build a museum and art school in his name. (Due to inflation, $250,000 in 1895 would be equivalent to about $7 million in 2014).

1900s
As a result of Herron's gift, the John Herron Art Institute was formed in 1902 to serve as an art museum and an art school. The Institute's Herron Museum, an Italian Renaissance Revival-style building, was designed by Vonnegut and Bohn architects and located at 1701 North Pennsylvania Street in the present-day Morton Place. The institute's main building was designed by Paul Philippe Cret in 1929 and was the second facility in the nation designed specifically for art education.

The first core faculty included Indiana Impressionist painters of the Hoosier Group: T.C. Steele, J. Ottis Adams, William Forsyth, Richard Gruelle, and Otto Stark. The sculptor Rudolph Schwarz was also in the first core faculty.

1960s
Fesler Hall, constructed in 1962, was a major addition to the John Herron Art Institute site along N. Pennsylvania St. It was Indianapolis architect Evans Woollen III's first civic commission. The three-story academic building was a freestanding wing addition that connected via a covered walkway to the original, Cret-designed main building. Both of these structures are still standing. Woollen's addition was noted for its use of reinforced concrete and exposed columns, typical of Brutalist architecture, and its deeply coffered ceilings. The project was funded through a bequest of Caroline Marmon Fesler, a former board member and president of the Indianapolis Art Association.

In 1967, the Herron School of Art became a school of Indiana University. Two years later, it became part of IUPUI, located near downtown Indianapolis. In 1970, the Indianapolis Museum of Art separated from the school, taking with it a majority of Herron's art collection.
2000s

The Herron School of Art and Design launched a capital campaign to raise funds for new buildings in 1999, and in 2000 a ceramic arts facility was opened.

In 2000, Herron School of Art and Design was among the earliest tenants to set up residency in the recently established Harrison Center.

In 2003, The Herron Chronicle was published detailing the past 100 years of the school's history.

In 2005, Eskenazi Hall, the current home of the school, was completed. This  facility tripled the amount of space available to Herron students and includes a  library, a 240-seat auditorium,  of gallery space, and several computer labs.

Since 2006, Herron's original academic buildings have housed Herron High School, a classical liberal arts charter high school.

Degrees offered

Bachelor of Arts
Art History

Bachelor of Art EducationBachelor of Fine Arts
Ceramics
Furniture Design
Drawing and Illustration
Integrative Studio Practices
Painting
Photography
Printmaking
Sculpture
Visual Communication Design

Master of Art TherapyMaster of Fine Arts
Visual Communication Design
Visual Art

Minors and Certificates
Art History Minor
Book Arts Minor
Design Production Minor
Design Thinking for Collaborative Innovation Certificate
Pre-Art Therapy Certificate
Studio Art & Technology Minor

Benefactors
Caroline Marmon Fesler: The daughter of local industrialist and automobile manufacturer Daniel W. Marmon, she studied painting in Europe. Later, she became a well-known art collector, especially of 20th-century modernist works, many of which she later gave to the Herron Museum—including Grey Hills by her friend, Georgia O'Keeffe. Along with Sullivan, Fesler propelled the Herron Museum into the era of modern art.

Herman C. Krannert: Founder and president of Inland Container Corporation, Krannert agreed to take charge of the Art Association in 1960, at a point when the organization was struggling to stay afloat. Krannert insisted the group reorganize its board and its way of doing business, including creating the position of board chairman—he became the first person to have that title and he held it for 12 years. His tenure culminated in relocating the museum from the Herron campus at 16th and Pennsylvania streets to its current site at W. 38th St. and Michigan Rd., and the Art Association's name was changed to the Indianapolis Museum of Art.

Notable alumni

See also
Hoosier Group
Irvington Group

References

External links

Herron.iupui.edu: official IUPUI Herron School of Art and Design website
Iupui.edu: official IUPUI—Indiana University – Purdue University Indianapolis website
Indianapolis Museum of Art blog: the 125th IMA Anniversary "Power to the People" exhibit — history of IMA.
National Park Service: Herron-Morton Place Historic District, Indianapolis
A biography of John Herron by Donald Prell

Indiana University–Purdue University Indianapolis
Art schools in Indiana
Design schools in the United States
Educational institutions established in 1902
1902 establishments in Indiana
Hoosier Group landscape painters
Art museums and galleries in Indiana
Tourist attractions in Indianapolis